In enzymology, an oxaloacetate tautomerase is an enzyme that catalyzes the chemical reaction

keto-oxaloacetate  enol-oxaloacetate

Hence, this enzyme has one substrate, keto-oxaloacetate, and one product, enol-oxaloacetate.

This enzyme belongs to the family of isomerases, specifically those intramolecular oxidoreductases interconverting keto- and enol-groups.  The systematic name of this enzyme class is oxaloacetate keto---enol-isomerase. This enzyme is also called oxaloacetic keto-enol isomerase.

While oxaloacetate tautomerase was characterized in several papers in the 1960s and 1970s, this activity has not been correlated with any gene identified in the genome of higher organisms.

References

 

EC 5.3.2
Enzymes of unknown structure